The Alpha Band was an American rock band, formed in July 1976 from the remnants of Bob Dylan's Rolling Thunder Revue.

Band members were T-Bone Burnett, Steven Soles, and David Mansfield, plus sidemen who differed from record to record and included: David Kemper (later drummer for Bob Dylan and Jerry Garcia Band); gospel musician Andraé Crouch; and former Beatle Ringo Starr. 

Their three albums were remarkably obscure, even upon release. The group is now recalled mostly as a launching pad for Mansfield, and even more for launching Burnett.  Soles went behind the scenes and retired as an artist, while writing and producing for films and television.  When the band disbanded in 1979, all three members began producing albums for other artists.

Discography

Albums
 The Alpha Band, 1976
 Spark in the Dark, 1977
 The Statue Makers of Hollywood, 1978
 The Arista Albums, 2005, two-CD set compiling all three LPs

References

American rock music groups
Musical groups established in 1976
Musical groups disestablished in 1979
Arista Records artists
Bob Dylan
1976 establishments in the United States